The 24th Golden Raspberry Awards, or Razzies, were held on February 28, 2004, at the Sheraton Hotel in Santa Monica, California, to honor the worst films the film industry had to offer in 2003.

Late summer box office flop Gigli led the pack, receiving nine nominations and becoming the first film to sweep the six major categories (Worst Picture, Director, Actor, Actress, Screenplay, and Screen Couple). Tied for second most-nominated, with eight each, were the Mike Myers holiday film The Cat in the Hat and From Justin to Kelly, a remake of Where the Boys Are inspired by the television series American Idol. As with Bill Cosby on the 8th Golden Raspberry Awards and Tom Selleck on the 13th Golden Raspberry Awards, respectively. 

Ben Affleck did not attend the ceremony, but was quoted by the Associated Press as saying that he felt "stiffed" by the Golden Raspberry Awards committee, who did not send the prize out to him. Razzies founder John Wilson delivered the trophy to the studios of "Larry King Live" but Affleck was unimpressed and left it behind. Wilson retrieved the trophy and auctioned it on eBay. The trophy sold for $1700 which Wilson used to pay for the Ivar Theater for the 25th Golden Raspberry Awards the next year. Affleck went on to win the first Razzie Reedemer Award in 2014.

Winners and nominees

Films with multiple nominations 
These films received multiple nominations:

See also

 2003 in film
 76th Academy Awards
 57th British Academy Film Awards
 61st Golden Globe Awards
 10th Screen Actors Guild Awards

References

External links

Golden Raspberry Awards
Golden Raspberry Awards ceremonies
Golden Raspberry
2004 in American cinema
February 2004 events in the United States
Golden Raspberry